Stefano Buttiero [11] (born July 5, 1966, Turin, Italy) is an Italian professional race car driver who has competed in major races such as the Italian Touring Car Championship, Italian Formula Three Championship and the 24 Hours of Daytona, Road America 500, and American Le Mans Series and Grand Prix of Sonoma.

References

1966 births
Racing drivers from Turin
Living people